Built to Rule is a building blocks toyline from Hasbro that is compatible with such leading brands as Lego. These sets were released from 2003 to 2005. Sets are usually based upon existing toys and characters from the Hasbro brand, such as Tonka, G.I. Joe and Transformers: Armada.

G.I. Joe
Built To Rule was marketed as "Action Building Sets". All sets came with one set of building blocks you could build into a full sized vehicle, and one specially designed 3 3/4 G.I. Joe figure. The forearms and the calves of the figures sport places where blocks could be attached.

2003
The 2003 Built To Rule followed the G.I. Joe: Spy Troops story line.
 Armadillo Assault with Duke
 Depth Ray with Wet Suit
 Forest Fox with Frostbite
 Locust with Hollow Point
 Raging Typhoon with Blowtorch
 Rock Crusher with Gung-Ho
 Cobra Moccasin with Cobra Moray
 Cobra Raven with Wild Weasel

2004
Some of the figures in 2004 featured additional articulation with a mid-thigh cut joint.
 Ground Striker with Flint
 Patriot Grizzly with Hi-Tech
 Rapid Runner with Chief Torpedo
 Rising Tide with Barrel Roll
 Sledgehammer with Heavy Duty
 Headquarters Attack with Snake Eyes - Includes Cobra Firebat with A.V.A.C.
 Cobra H.I.S.S. with Cobra Commander
 Cobra Night Prowler with Shadow Viper
 Cobra Sand Snake with Firefly
 Cobra Venom Striker with Firefly

2005
 Freedom Defense Outpost with Duke

Transformers
Transformers Built to Rule toys were predicted by some groups to be big sellers in 2003. A small number of Transformers: Energon Built to Rule sets had a limited, test market release, but the entire line performed poorly, so it was dropped in its entirety in 2004.

There are some significant differences between the Armada and Energon sets, though both are based on the same basic premise. Each Transformers kit is centered on a "Trans-Skeleton", a very simple humanoid body that folds up for vehicle mode without dis-assembly. From there, extra parts are added to the Trans-Skeleton for either mode. For Armada, the Trans-Skeleton was a very broad, flat solid plate with thin, stick-like limbs attached to it, which led to very awkward-looking robot modes. The structure of the Trans-Skeleton was changed for the Energon characters, to a much more solid skeleton with larger, blockier limbs. This led to much more solid, stable and sturdy-looking robot modes.

Transformers: Armada sets
 Demolishor & Blackout
 Demolishor & Blackout (Night Attack)
 Hot Shot & Jolt
 Jetfire & Comettor
 Megatron & Leader-1 (with Cyclonus & Crumplezone)
 Optimus Prime & Sparkplug
 Red Alert & Longarm
 Smokescreen & Liftor
 Starscream & Swindle
 Thundercracker & Zapmaster

Transformers: Energon sets
 Ironhide
 Optimus Prime
 Skyblast
 Inferno
 Starscream
 Scorponok

See also
 Kre-O
 Lego clone

References

Construction toys
2000s toys
G.I. Joe
Transformers (toy line)